Taymyr or Taimyr may refer to:

Places
Taymyr Peninsula, a peninsula in Siberia
Taymyr Gulf
Taymyra, a river in the Taymyr Peninsula
Lake Taymyr
Taymyr Island, an island in the Kara Sea
Taymyr Autonomous Okrug, a former federal subject of Russia

Transportation
Taymyr (icebreaker), "Taymyr" ship name used for icebreakers
Taymyr (1909 icebreaker), a steam-powered icebreaker
Taymyr class nuclear icebreaker
Taymyr (1987 icebreaker), a nuclear-powered shallow draft icebreaker

See also
Maly Taymyr Island, an island in the Laptev Sea
Taymyrsky Dolgano-Nenetsky District